Sokolow et al v. Palestine Liberation Organization et al was  a civil case considered by US federal courts, against the Palestine Liberation Organization (PLO) and the Palestinian Authority. The plaintiffs were US citizens injured in terrorist attacks in Israel and US citizens who are relatives of those who were killed by these attacks. They sued Palestine Liberation Organization and Palestinian Authority under the Antiterrorism Act of 1991, demanding $1 billion or more in damages. On 31 August 2016, the Second US Circuit Court of Appeals in Manhattan dismissed the lawsuit on the grounds that US federal courts lacked overseas jurisdiction on civil cases, and the 2nd Circuit decision was effectively upheld on appeal when the Supreme Court of the United States refused to hear an appeal of the Sokolow decision, sending the case back to the trial court for dismissal.

History 

The trial in the Manhattan federal district court began on January 12, 2015, presided over by US Federal District judge George B. Daniels, after Daniels ruled against the PLO and PA's request for summary judgement for lack of jurisdiction.

Lawyers for the plaintiffs said they could seek orders to have the defendants' bank accounts frozen and to require them to turn over real estate and other property. The judgments could also be taken to other countries, where the defendants do business or have assets. In addition, Israel, as punishment for the Palestinians' move in December 2014 to join the International Criminal Court, began withholding more than $100 million a month in tax revenue it collects on the Palestinians' behalf and the plaintiffs could also go after those taxes.

Appeal
On 31 August 2016, the Second US Circuit Court of Appeals in Manhattan overturned the verdict of the Manhattan federal district court and dismissed the lawsuit on the grounds that US federal courts lacked overseas jurisdiction on civil cases. The appeals court's decision was criticized by the lawyers and families of the victims but was praised by lawyers and representatives of the Palestinian government. An appeal to the Supreme Court was turned down in April 2018.

The Sokolow Decision in scholarship
Michael Ratner has written that the US Court's ruling against the Palestinian Authority failed to treat Palestine as a state, immune, like Israel, from suits of this kind. He says that there is no jurisdiction over Palestine, that links between the murderers as the PNA unproven, that a fair jury was impossible to obtain in the U.S. and that the trial should not have taken place. It was, he added, both an obstacle to Palestinian victims seeking redress from Israel and a measure that held Palestinians to be collectively responsible for the acts of a few.

See also
Shurat HaDin

References

External links
Sokolow et al v. Palestine Liberation Organization et al
Palestine Liberation Organization on Trial in US Civil Case

Trials in the United States
Palestinian terrorism